The 2017–18 Saskatchewan Junior Hockey League was the league's 49th Season.

Final standings 
 x = Clinched playoff position
 y = Clinched division
 e = Eliminated from playoffs

Playoffs

Humboldt Broncos bus crash 

On April 6, 2018, the Humboldt Broncos team bus crashed on an intersection near Armley, Saskatchewan resulting in the deaths of 16 people and injuring 13 others, including players. At the time, the Nipawin Hawks had a 3-1 lead over the Broncos, while the Estavan Bruins were waiting to play in the League Finals.

As a result, the game was not played and instead the Nipawin Hawks went on to the league Finals.

ANAVET Cup

References 

Saskatchewan Junior Hockey League